Carrie L. Ruud (born February 22, 1952) is a Minnesota politician and member of the Minnesota Senate. A member of the Republican Party of Minnesota, she represents District 10 in north-central Minnesota.

Early life
Ruud was born in St. Cloud, Minnesota and raised in Robbinsdale, Minnesota.

Minnesota Senate
Ruud was first elected to the Minnesota Senate in 2003. She was defeated by Mary Olson in the 2006 election. She ran and was elected again in 2012.

Personal life
Ruud is married to Dick Rostad. They have five children and reside in Breezy Point, Minnesota, where Ruud served as mayor from 2001 to 2002.

References

External links

Senator Carrie Ruud official Minnesota Senate website
Senator Carrie Ruud official campaign website

1952 births
Living people
Republican Party Minnesota state senators
Women state legislators in Minnesota
21st-century American politicians
21st-century American women politicians
People from Robbinsdale, Minnesota